Reid Avenue was a station on the demolished BMT Fulton Street Line. It had 2 tracks and 2 side platforms. It was served by trains of the BMT Fulton Street Line. The station was opened in 1888 and was originally named Utica Avenue station. Sometime between 1912 and 1924, the name of the station was changed to Reid Avenue. The station was also served by a streetcar line with the same name both before and after the name change. The next stop to the east was Ralph Avenue. The next stop to the west was Troy Avenue. In 1936, the Independent Subway System built their own Fulton Street subway and added an underground subway station with the old name. The el station became obsolete, and it closed on May 31, 1940.

References

Defunct BMT Fulton Street Line stations
Railway stations in the United States opened in 1888
Railway stations closed in 1940